This article contains a list of Marathi writers arranged in the English alphabetical order of the writers' last names.

 
Lists of writers by language
Lists of Indian writers